Thierry Langer (born 24 October 1991) is a Belgian cross-country skier and biathlete. He competed in the men's 15 kilometre freestyle at the 2018 Winter Olympics.

Biathlon results
All results are sourced from the International Biathlon Union.

World Championships
0 medals

*During Olympic seasons competitions are only held for those events not included in the Olympic program.
**The single mixed relay was added as an event in 2019.

References

External links
 

1991 births
Living people
Belgian male cross-country skiers
Belgian male biathletes
Olympic cross-country skiers of Belgium
Cross-country skiers at the 2018 Winter Olympics
Olympic biathletes of Belgium
Biathletes at the 2022 Winter Olympics
People from Malmedy
Sportspeople from Liège Province